Karine Lebon (born 9 June 1985) is a French politician and former actress and teacher. She is the Member of Parliament for Réunion's 2nd constituency.

Career 
Lebon was elected in September 2020, under the Pour La Réunion banner, replacing Huguette Bello who resigned. She sits in the Democratic and Republican Left group in Parliament. She was re-elected in the 2022 National Assembly election.

References 

Living people
1985 births
21st-century French women politicians
Deputies of the 15th National Assembly of the French Fifth Republic
Deputies of the 16th National Assembly of the French Fifth Republic
Members of Parliament for Réunion
French communists
French schoolteachers
21st-century French actresses
Women members of the National Assembly (France)